Stanley "Bunny" Albert Joseph (April 28, 1928 – March 21, 2001) was a Canadian amateur box lacrosse goaltender.  A member of the Canadian Lacrosse Hall of Fame, Bunny was the winner of three Mann Cup national championships over the span of a 25-year career.  He is known for his unorthodox goaltending style and longevity as an elite goaltender in the sport.  At the time of his death he was a highly respected elder of the Squamish Nation in North Vancouver.

Career
Joseph started his Senior A career as a teenager.  Like his father, veteran of 3 Mann Cup finals Stan Joseph, Bunny started his career with the North Shore Indians.  As a goalie, he stood out - not just because of his great play, but because of his unorthodox style.  Bunny played with both hands on his stick and the head of his stick to his side at waist level, a style unique even to this day.

In 1955, the Indians folded and Bunny played the 1956 season with Vancouver, before shipping over to the powerhouse New Westminster Salmonbellies.  In 1958, he helped lead the Salmonbellies to a Mann Cup victory over the Long Branch Pontiacs.  A season later, he would win another Mann Cup against the Peterborough Timbermen, but see severely diminished playing time due to the rise of rookie phenom Les Norman.  In the winter he asked for a tryout with the Vancouver Carlings.  With something to prove and a new club, Bunny finished off his second season with the Carlings with his third Mann Cup victory.  Bunny played two more seasons of Senior A, then took a player-coach position with the Senior B North Shore Indians.

Bunny Joseph would return to the Senior A ranks from 1968 until 1970 with North Vancouver and the Coquitlam Adanacs.  He played his final game of Senior A with the Adanacs on July 11, 1970 before calling it a career.  He would return to the Indians Sr. B team to dabble for a couple more seasons, but after 25 years he was done with Sr. A lacrosse.

Bunny was inducted into the Canadian Lacrosse Hall of Fame in 1976.  To this day, Bunny Joseph has played the fourth most games (522) of any Western Lacrosse Association player and has faced and stopped more shots than any other WLA goaltender in regular season (10,747 of 15,302) and season and playoff combined (13,040 of 18,456), all while maintaining a 0.707 save percentage.

Statistics
''Source: Wamper's Bible of Lacrosse and Stan Shillington's "Who's Who in Lacrosse 1933-2013: Goaltending Records".

References 

Canadian lacrosse players
Sportspeople from British Columbia
1928 births
2001 deaths